The 2013 WSBL season was the 25th season of the Women's State Basketball League (SBL). The regular season began on Friday 15 March and ended on Saturday 27 July. The finals began on Friday 2 August and ended on Friday 30 August, when the Wanneroo Wolves defeated the Kalamunda Eastern Suns in the WSBL Grand Final.

Regular season
The regular season began on Friday 15 March and ended on Saturday 27 July after 20 rounds of competition.

Standings

Finals
The finals began on Friday 2 August and ended on Friday 30 August with the WSBL Grand Final.

Bracket

Awards

Player of the Week

Statistics leaders

Regular season
 Most Valuable Player: Sami Whitcomb (Rockingham Flames)
 Coach of the Year: Glenn Ellis (Stirling Senators)
 Most Improved Player: Gabby O'Sullivan (Perth Redbacks)
 All-Star Five:
 PG: Taylor Wild (Stirling Senators)
 SG: Kim Sitzmann (South West Slammers)
 SF: Sami Whitcomb (Rockingham Flames)
 PF: Lisa Wallbutton (Willetton Tigers)
 C: Marita Payne (Perth Redbacks)

Finals
 Grand Final MVP: Nikita-Lee Martin (Wanneroo Wolves)

References

External links
 2013 fixtures
 2013 grand final preview

2013
2012–13 in Australian basketball
2013–14 in Australian basketball